The 1987 Pepsi Canadian Junior Curling Championships were held at the Prince Albert Golf and Curling Club in Prince Albert, Saskatchewan.

It was the first Canadian Junior championship to hold both the men's and women's events in conjunction with one another.

Men's

Teams

Standings

Results

Draw 1

Draw 2

Draw 3

Draw 4

Draw 5

Draw 6

Draw 7

Draw 8

Draw 9

Draw 10

Draw 11

Draw 12

Draw 13

Draw 14

Draw 15

Draw 16

Playoffs

Tiebreaker

Semifinal

Final

Women's

Teams

Standings

Results

Draw 1

Draw 2

Draw 3

Draw 4

Draw 5

Draw 6

Draw 7

Draw 8

Draw 9

Draw 10

Draw 11

Draw 12

Draw 13

Draw 14

Draw 15

Draw 16

Playoffs

Semifinal

Final

External links
Men's statistics
Women's statistics

Canadian Junior Curling Championships
Curling in Saskatchewan
Sport in Prince Albert, Saskatchewan
Canadian Junior Curling Championships
1987 in Saskatchewan